Australia has more than 400 species of butterfly, the majority of which are continental species, and more than a dozen endemic species from remote islands administered by various Australian territorial governments. The largest butterflies in the world are endemic to the Australasian realm. They are the birdwings—Ornithoptera and other genera—of the tribe Troidini of the swallowtail butterfly family, Papilionidae.

Papilionidae: swallowtails
Family: Papilionidae (swallowtails) — 18+2 species [*2 non-continental species]

Papilioninae

 subfamily: Papilioninae
 tribe: Leptocircini (formerly Graphiini)
 genus: Protographium
Four-barred swordtail, Protographium leosthenes (Doubleday, 1846) — pictured
P. l. leosthenes (Doubleday, 1846)
P. l. geimbia (Tindale, 1927)
 genus: Graphium (swordtails)
 Five-barred or chain swordtail, Graphium aristeus (Stoll, 1780)
 Macleay's swordtail, Graphium macleayanus (Leach, 1814)
 G. m. macleayanus (Leach, 1814)
 G. m. moggana (Couchman, 1965)
 Blue triangle, Graphium sarpedon (Linnaeus, 1758) — pictured
 Pale triangle, Graphium eurypylus (Linnaeus, 1758)
 G. e. lycaon (C. & R. Felder, 1865)
 G. e. nyctimus (Waterhouse & Lyell, 1914)
 G. e. lycanoides (Rothschild, 1895)
 Green triangle, Graphium macfarlanei (Butler, 1877)
 Green-spotted triangle, Graphium agamemnon (Linnaeus, 1758)
 tribe: Papilionini (fluted swallowtails)
 genus: Papilio (Linnaeus, 1758)
 Dainty swallowtail, Papilio anactus (W. S. Macleay, 1826)
 Orchard swallowtail, Papilio aegeus (Donovan, 1805) — pictured
 P. a. aegeus (Donovan, 1805)
 P. a. ormenus (Guérin-Méneville, 1830)
 Ambrax swallowtail, Papilio ambrax (Boisduval, 1832)
 Fuscus swallowtail, Papilio fuscus (Goeze, 1779)
 P. f. canopus (Westwood, 1842)
 P. f. capaneus (Westwood, 1843)
 P. f. indicatus (Butler, 1876)
 Ulysses swallowtail, Papilio ulysses (Linnaeus, 1758) — pictured
 Chequered swallowtail, Papilio demoleus (Linnaeus, 1758)
 *Christmas swallowtail, Papilio memnon (Linnaeus, 1758) [*native to Christmas Island]
 *Norfolk swallowtail, Papilio amynthor (Boisduval, 1859) [*native to Norfolk Island]
 tribe: Troidini (Aristolochia-eating swallowtails)
 genus: Cressida
 Clearwing swallowtail, Cressida cressida (Fabricius, 1775)
 C. c. cressida (Fabricius, 1775)
 genus: Ornithoptera (birdwings)
 Richmond birdwing, Ornithoptera richmondia (Gray, 1853)
 Cairns birdwing, Ornithoptera euphorion (Gray, 1853) — pictured
 New Guinea or common green birdwing, Ornithoptera priamus (Linnaeus, 1758)
 O. p. poseidon (Doubleday, 1847)
 O. p. pronomus (Gray, 1853)
 O. p. macalpinei (Moulds, 1974)
 genus: Pachliopta
 Red-bodied swallowtail, Pachliopta polydorus (Linnaeus, 1763)

Pieridae: whites and yellows

family: Pieridae (whites and yellows) — 35+2+1 species [†1 introduced species]

Pierinae: whites
 subfamily: Pierinae (whites)
 tribe: Elodinini
 genus: Elodina (pearl-whites)
 Southern pearl-white, Elodina angulipennis (H. Lucas, 1852)
 Cape York pearl-white, Elodina claudia (de Baar & Hancock, 1993)
 Narrow-winged pearl-white, Elodina padusa (Hewitson, 1853)
 Striated pearl-white, Elodina parthia (Hewitson, 1853)
 Delicate pearl-white, Elodina perdita (Miskin, 1889)
 Glistening pearl-white, Elodina queenslandica (de Baar & Hancock, 1993)
 Small pearl-white, Elodina walkeri (Butler, 1898)
 tribe: Leptosiaini
 genus: Leptosia
 Black-spotted white, Leptosia nina (Fabricius, 1793) — pictured right
 tribe: Pierini
 genus: Appias (albatrosses)
 Orange albatross, Appias ada (Waterhouse & Lyell, 1914)
 A. a. caria (Waterhouse & Lyell, 1914)
 White or common albatross, Appias albina (Boisduval, 1836) — pictured right
 A. a. albina (Boisduval, 1836)
 Blue albatross, Appias celestina (Boisduval, 1832)
 Grey albatross, Appias melania (Fabricius, 1775)
 Yellow albatross, Appias paulina (Cramer, 1777)
 A. p. ega (Boisduval, 1836)
 Striped albatross, Appias olferna (Swinhoe, 1890)
 genus: Pieris
 †Small cabbage white, Pieris rapae (Linnaeus, 1758) [†introduced species] — pictured right
 genus: Belenois (formerly Anaphaeis)
 Caper white, Belenois java — pictured right
 B. j. peristhene (Boisduval, 1859)
 B. j. teutonia (Fabricius, 1775)
 genus: Cepora
 Caper gull, Cepora perimale (Donovan, 1805)
 C. p. scyllara (W. S. Macleay, 1826)
 genus: Delias (Jezebels)
 Spotted Jezebel, Delias aganippe (Donovan, 1805)
 Scarlet Jezebel, Delias argenthona (Fabricius, 1793) — pictured right
 D. a. argenthona (Fabricius, 1793)
 Golden Jezebel, Delias aruna (Boisduval, 1832)
 D. a. inferna (Butler, 1871)
 Yellow-banded Jezebel, Delias ennia (Wallace, 1867)
 D. e. nigidius (Miskin, 1884)
 D. e. tindalii (Joicey & Talbot, 1926)
 Imperial Jezebel, Delias harpalyce (Donovan, 1805)
 Red-banded Jezebel, Delias mysis (Fabricius, 1775) — pictured right
 D. m. mysis (Fabricius, 1775)
 D. m. aestiva (Butler, 1897)
 D. m. onca (Fruhstorfer, 1910)
 Black Jezebel, Delias nigrina (Fabricius, 1775)
 Yellow-spotted Jezebel, Delias nysa (Fabricius, 1775)
 D. n. nysa (Fabricius, 1775)
 D. n. nivira (Waterhouse & Lyell, 1914)

Coliadinae: yellows

 subfamily: Coliadinae (yellows)
 genus: Catopsilia (migrants or emigrants)
 White migrant, Catopsilia pyranthe (Linnaeus, 1758)
 C. p. crokera (W. S. Macleay, 1826)
 Lemon migrant, Catopsilia pomona (Fabricius, 1775) — pictured right
 Orange migrant, Catopsilia scylla (Linnaeus, 1764)
 C. s. etesia (Hewitson, 1867)
 Yellow migrant, Catopsilia gorgophone (Boisduval, 1836)
 C. g. gorgophone (Boisduval, 1836)
 genus: Eurema (grass-yellows)
 No-brand grass-yellow, Eurema brigitta (Stoll, 1780) — pictured right
 E. b. australis (Wallace, 1867)
 E. b. zoraide (C. & R. Felder, 1865)
 Lined grass-yellow, Eurema laeta (Boisduval, 1836)
 E. l. sana (Butler, 1877)
 Pink grass-yellow, Eurema herla (W. S. Macleay, 1826)
 Small grass-yellow, Eurema smilax (Donovan, 1805)
 E. s. smilax (Donovan, 1805)
 Broad-margined grass-yellow, Eurema puella (Boisduval, 1832)
 E. p. papuan (Butler, 1898)
 E. p. virgo (Wallace, 1867)
 Scalloped grass-yellow, Eurema alitha (C. & R. Felder, 1832)
 Large grass-yellow, Eurema hecabe (Linnaeus, 1758) — pictured right
 E. h. hecabe (Linnaeus, 1758)
 E. h. phoebus (Butler, 1886)
 *Three-spot grass yellow, Eurema blanda (Boisduval, 1836) [*native to Christmas and Darnley Islands]

Riodinidae: metalmarks

family: Riodinidae (metalmarks) — 1 species

Nemeobiinae
 subfamily: Nemeobiinae
 genus: Praetaxila
 Harlequin metalmark, Praetaxila segecia (Hewitson, 1861) — pictured right
 P. s. punctaria (Fruhstorfer, 1914)

Lycaenidae: gossamer-winged blues and coppers
family: Lycaenidae (gossamer-winged blues and coppers) — 142+7 species

Miletinae: harvesters

 subfamily: Miletinae (harvesters)
 tribe: Liphyrini
 genus: Liphyra
 Moth butterfly, Liphyra brassolis (Westwood, 1864) — pictured right
 L. b. major (Rothschild, 1898)

Theclinae: hairstreaks

 subfamily: Theclinae (hairstreaks)
 tribe: Luciini
 genus: Lucia
 Chequered copper, Lucia limbaria (Swainson, 1833)
 genus: Paralucia
 Bright copper, Paralucia aurifera (Blanchard, 1848)
 Fiery copper, Paralucia pyrodiscus (Doubleday, 1847)
 P. p. lucida (Crosby, 1951)
 Purple or Bathurst copper, Paralucia spinifera (Edwards & Common, 1978) — pictured right
 genus: Pseudodipsas
 Bright forest-blue, Pseudodipsas cephenes (Hewitson, 1874)
 Dark forest-blue, Pseudodipsas eone (C. & R. Felder, 1865)
 P. e. iole (Waterhouse & Lyell, 1914)
 genus: Acrodipsas (ant-blues)
 Black-veined ant-blue, Acrodipsas arcana (Miller & Edwards, 1978)
 Golden ant-blue, Acrodipsas aurata (Sands, 1997)
 Bronze ant-blue, Acrodipsas brisbanensis (Miskin, 1884)
 Copper ant-blue, Acrodipsas cuprea (Sands, 1965)
 Decima ant-blue, Acrodipsas decima Miller and Lane, 2004
 Black ant-blue, Acrodipsas hirtipes (Sands, 1980)
 Mangrove or Illidge's ant-blue, Acrodipsas illidgei (Waterhouse & Lyell, 1914) — pictured right
 Grey ant-blue, Acrodipsas melania (Sands, 1980) — pictured right
 Brown ant-blue, Acrodipsas mortoni (Sands, Miller & Kerr, 1997)
 Small ant-blue, Acrodipsas myrmecophila (Waterhouse & Lyell, 1913)
 genus: Hypochrysops (jewels)
 Copper jewel, Hypochrysops apelles (Fabricius, 1775)
 H. a. apelles (Fabricius, 1775)
 Apollo jewel, Hypochrysops apollo (Miskin, 1891)
 H. a. apollo (Miskin, 1891)
 H. a. phoebus (Waterhouse, 1928)
 Yellow jewel, Hypochrysops byzos (Boisduval, 1832) — pictured right
 Splendid jewel, Hypochrysops cleon (Grose-Smith, 1900)
 Cyane jewel, Hypochrysops cyane (Waterhouse & Lyell, 1914)
 Moonlight jewel, Hypochrysops delicia (Hewitson, 1875)
 H. d. delicia (Hewitson, 1875)
 H. d. duaringae (Waterhouse, 1903)
 Silky jewel, Hypochrysops digglesii (Hewitson, 1874)
 Amethyst jewel, Hypochrysops elgneri (Waterhouse & Lyell, 1909)
 H. e. elgneri (Waterhouse & Lyell, 1909)
 H. e. barnardi (Waterhouse, 1934)
 Mangrove jewel, Hypochrysops epicurus (Miskin, 1876) — pictured right
 Turquoise jewel, Hypochrysops halyaetus (Hewitson, 1874) — pictured right
 Paradise jewel, Hypochrysops hippuris (Hewitson, 1874)
 H. h. nebulosis (Sands, 1986)
 Fiery jewel, Hypochrysops ignita (Leach, 1814)
 H. i. ignita (Leach, 1814)
 H. i. chrysonotus (Grose-Smith, 1899)
 H. i. erythina (Waterhouse & Lyell, 1914)
 H. i. oliffi (Miskin, 1889)
 Coral jewel, Hypochrysops miskini (Waterhouse, 1903)
 H. m. miskini (Waterhouse, 1903)
 Narcissus jewel, Hypochrysops narcissus (Fabricius, 1775) — pictured right
 H. n. narcissus (Fabricius, 1775)
 H. n. sabirus (Fruhstorfer, 1908)
 Bulloak jewel, Hypochrysops piceata (Kerr, Macqueen & Sands, 1969)
 Royal jewel, Hypochrysops polycletus (Linnaeus, 1758)
 H. p. rovena (Druce, 1891)
 Peacock jewel, Hypochrysops pythias (C. & R. Felder, 1865)
 H. p. euclides (Miskin, 1889)
 Green-banded jewel, Hypochrysops theon (C. & R. Felder, 1865)
 H. t. medocus (Fruhstorfer, 1908)
 H. t. cretatus (Sands, 1986)
 genus: Philiris (moonbeams)
 Azure moonbeam, Philiris azule (Wind & Clench, 1947)
 Large moonbeam, Philiris diana (Waterhouse & Lyell, 1914)
 P. d. diana (Waterhouse & Lyell, 1914)
 P. d. papuanus (Wind & Clench, 1947)
 Bicolour moonbeam, Philiris fulgens (Grose, Smith & Kirby, 1897)
 P. f. kurandae (Waterhouse, 1903)
 Purple moonbeam, Philiris innotatus (Miskin, 1874)
 Blue moonbeam, Philiris nitens (Grose-Smith, 1898)
 P. n. nitens (Grose-Smith, 1898)
 P. n. lucina (Waterhouse & Lyell, 1914)
 Sapphire moonbeam, Philiris sappheira (Sands, 1980)
 White-margined moonbeam, Philiris ziska (Grose-Smith, 1898)
 tribe: Arhopalini
 genus: Arhopala (oak-blues)
 Arhopala eupolis (Miskin, 1890)
 Bright oak-blue, Arhopala madytus (Fruhstorfer, 1914)
 Shining oak-blue, Arhopala micale (Blanchard, 1848)
 A. m. amphis (Waterhouse, 1942)
 White oak-blue, Arhopala wildei (Miskin, 1891)
 A. w. wildei (Miskin, 1891)
 tribe: Ogyrini
 genus: Ogyris (azures)
 Dark purple azure, Ogyris abrota (Westwood, 1851)
 Sapphire azure, Ogyris aenone (Waterhouse, 1902)
 Satin azure, Ogyris amaryllis (Hewitson, 1862)
 Bright purple azure, Ogyris barnardi (Miskin, 1890)
 Southern purple azure, Ogyris genoveva (Hewitson, 1853)
 Golden azure, Ogyris ianthis (Waterhouse, 1900)
 Large bronze azure, Ogyris idmo (Hewitson, 1862)
 Orange-tipped azure, Ogyris iphis (Waterhouse & Lyell, 1914)
 Broad-margined azure, Ogyris olane (Hewitson, 1862)
 Silky azure, Ogyris oroetes (Hewitson, 1862)
 Small bronze azure, Ogyris otanes (C. & R. Felder, 1865)
 Arid bronze azure, Ogyris subterrestris (Field, 1999)
 Northern purple azure, Ogyris zosine (Hewitson, 1853)
 tribe: Zesiini (hairstreaks)
 genus: Jalmenus
 Inland hairstreak, Jalmenus aridus (Graham & Moulds, 1988)
 Turquoise hairstreak, Jalmenus clementi (Druce, 1902)
 Emerald hairstreak, Jalmenus daemeli (Semper, 1879)
 Northern hairstreak, Jalmenus eichhorni (Staudinger, 1888)
 Imperial hairstreak, Jalmenus evagoras (Donovan, 1805)
 Amethyst hairstreak, Jalmenus icilius (Hewitson, 1865)
 Jalmenus eubulus Miskin, 1876
 Stencilled hairstreak, Jalmenus ictinus (Hewitson, 1865)
 Varied hairstreak, Jalmenus inous (Hewitson, 1865)
 J. i. inous (Hewitson, 1865)
 J. i. notocrucifer (Johnson, Hay & Bollam, 1992)
 Waterhouse's hairstreak, Jalmenus lithochroa (Waterhouse, 1903)
 Macqueen's hairstreak, Jalmenus pseudictinus (Kerr & Macqueen, 1967)
 genus: Pseudalmenus
 Silky hairstreak, Pseudalmenus chlorinda (Blanchard, 1948)
 P. c. chlorinda (Blanchard, 1948)
 P. c. conara (Couchman, 1965)
 P. c. zephyrus (Waterhouse & Lyell, 1914)
 P. c. myrsilus (Westwood, 1851)
 P. c. chloris (Waterhouse & Lyell, 1914)
 P. c. barringtonensis (Waterhouse, 1928)
 tribe: Hypolycaenini
 genus: Hypolycaena
 Orchid flash, Hypolycaena danis (C. & R. Felder, 1865)
 H. d. turneri (Waterhouse, 1903)
 Black-spotted flash, Hypolycaena phorbas (Fabricius, 1793)
 H. p. phorbas (Fabricius, 1793)
 H. p. ingura (Tindale, 1923)
 tribe: Deudorigini

 genus: Deudorix
 Dark cornelian, Deudorix epijarbas (Moore, 1858) — pictured right
 D. e. dido (Waterhouse, 1934)
 D. e. diovis (Hewitson, 1863)
 Bright cornelian, Deudorix diovis (Hewitson, 1863)
 Orange-lobed flash, Deudorix epirus (C. Felder, 1860)
 D. e. agimar (Fruhstorfer, 1908)
 White-spotted flash, Deudorix democles (Miskin, 1884)
 D. d. democles (Miskin, 1884)
 Princess flash, Deudorix smilis (Hewitson, 1863)
 D. s. dalyensis (le Souëf & Tindale, 1970)
 genus: Rapala
 Indigo flash, Rapala varuna (Horsfield, 1829) — pictured right
 R. v. simsoni (Miskin, 1874)
 genus: Bindahara
 Sword-tailed flash, Bindahara phocides (Fabricius, 1793)
 B. p. yurgama (Couchman, 1965)

Polyommatinae: blues
 subfamily: Polyommatinae (blues)
 tribe: Candalidini
 genus: Candalides (pencil– and dusky-blues)
 Shining pencil-blue, Candalides helenita (Semper, 1879)
 C. h. helenita (Semper, 1879)
 Trident pencil-blue, Candalides margarita (Semper, 1879)
 C. m. margarita (Semper, 1879)
 Northern pencil-blue, Candalides gilberti (Waterhouse, 1903)
 Common pencil-blue, Candalides absimilis (C. Felder, 1862)
 Dark pencil-blue, Candalides consimilis (Waterhouse, 1942)
 C. c. consimilis (Waterhouse, 1942)
 C. c. goodingi (Tindale, 1965)
 C. c. toza (Kerr, 1967)
 Copper pencil-blue, Candalides cyprotus (Olliff, 1886)
 C. c. cyprotus (Olliff, 1886)
 C. c. pallescens (Tite, 1963)
 Varied dusky-blue, Candalides hyacinthina (Semper, 1879)
 C. h. hyacinthina (Semper, 1879)
 C. h. simplexa (Tepper, 1882)
 C. h. gilesi (Williams & Bollam, 2001)
 Twin dusky-blue, Candalides geminus (Edwards & Kerr, 1978)
 Small dusky-blue, Candalides erinus (Fabricius, 1775)
 C. e. erinus (Fabricius, 1775)
 Blotched dusky-blue, Candalides acasta (Cox, 1873)
 Spotted dusky-blue, Candalides delospila (Waterhouse, 1903)
 Yellow-spotted blue, Candalides xanthospilos (Hübner, 1817)
 Rayed blue, Candalides heathi (Cox, 1873)
 C. h. heathi (Cox, 1873)
 C. h. alpina (Waterhouse, 1928)
 C. h. doddi (Burns, 1948)
 Golden-rayed blue, Candalides noelkeri (Braby & Douglas, 2004)
 genus: Nesolycaena (opals)
 Dark opal, Nesolycaena medicia (Miskin, 1891)
 Satin opal, Nesolycaena albosericea (Braby, 1996)
 Spotted opal, Nesolycaena urumelia (Tindale, 1922)
 Kimberley spotted opal, Nesolycaena caesia (d'Apice & Miller, 1992)
 tribe: Lycaenestheni
 genus: Anthene (ciliate-blues)
 Dark ciliate-blue, Anthene seltuttus (Röber, 1886)
 A. s. affinis (Waterhouse & RE Turner, 1905)
 Pale ciliate-blue, Anthene lycaenoides (C. Felder, 1860)
 A. l. godeffroyi (Semper, 1879)
 tribe: Polyommatini
 genus: Petrelaea
 Mauve line-blue, Petrelaea tombugensis (Röber, 1886)
 genus: Nacaduba
 Large purple line-blue, Nacaduba berenice (Herrich-Schäffer, 1869)
 N. b. berenice (Herrich-Schäffer, 1869)
 White-banded line-blue, Nacaduba kurava (Moore, 1858)
 N. k. parma (Waterhouse & Lyell, 1914)
 N. k. felsina (Waterhouse & Lyell, 1914)
 Two-spotted line-blue, Nacaduba biocellata (C. & R. Felder, 1865)
 N. b. biocellata (C. & R. Felder, 1865)
 Green-banded line-blue, Nacaduba cyanea (Cramer, 1775)
 *Violet line-blue, Nacaduba calauria (C. Felder, 1860) [*native to Dauan and Murray Islands]
 N. c. calauria (C. Felder, 1860)
 *Bold line-blue, Nacaduba pactolus (C. Felder, 1860) [*native to Darnley and Murray Islands]
 genus: Erysichton
 Hairy line-blue, Erysichton lineata (Murray, 1874)
 E. l. lineata (Murray, 1874)
 Marbled line-blue, Erysichton palmyra (C. Felder, 1860)
 E. p. tasmanicus (Miskin, 1890)
 genus: Danis
 Large green-banded blue, Danis danis (Cramer, 1775)
 D. d. serapis (Miskin, 1891)
 D. d. syrius (Miskin, 1890)
 genus: Nothodanis
 *Dark green-banded blue, Nothodanis schaeffera (Eschscholtz, 1821) [*native to Murray Island]
 genus: Psychonotis
 Small green-banded blue, Psychonotis caelius (C. Felder, 1860) — query this one
 P. c. taygetus (C. & R. Felder, 1865)
 genus: Prosotas
 Purple line-blue, Prosotas dubiosa (Semper, 1879)
 P. d. dubiosa (Semper, 1879)
 Short-tailed line-blue, Prosotas felderi (Murray, 1874)
 Long-tailed line-blue, Prosotas nora (Waterhouse & Lyell, 1914)
 P. n. auletes (Waterhouse & Lyell, 1914)
 *Gracile line-blue, Prosotas gracilis (Röber, 1886) [*native to Dauan Island]
 genus: Catopyrops
 Papuan line-blue, Catopyrops ancyra (Waterhouse & Lyell, 1914)
 C. a. mysia (Waterhouse & Lyell, 1914)
 Speckled line-blue, Catopyrops florinda (Butler, 1877)
 C. f. halys (Waterhouse, 1934)
 C. f. estrella (Waterhouse & Lyell, 1914)
 genus: Ionolyce
 Bronze line-blue, Ionolyce helicon (Waterhouse & Lyell, 1914)
 I. h. hyllus (Waterhouse & Lyell, 1914)
 genus: Theclinesthes
 Bitter-bush blue, Theclinesthes albocincta (Waterhouse, 1903)
 Western bitter-bush blue, Theclinesthes hesperia (Sibatani & Grund, 1978)
 T. h. hesperia (Sibatani & Grund, 1978)
 T. h. littoralis (Sibatani & Grund, 1978)
 Wattle blue, Theclinesthes miskini (T. P. Lucas, 1889)
 T. m. miskini (T. P. Lucas, 1889)
 T. m. eucalypti (Sibatani & Grund, 1978)
 T. m. arnoldi (Fruhstorfer, 1916)
 Cycad blue, Theclinesthes onycha (Hewitson, 1865)
 T. o. onycha (Hewitson, 1865)
 T. o. capricornia (Sibatani & Grund, 1978)
 Saltbush blue, Theclinesthes serpentata (Herrich-Schäffer, 1869)
 T. s. serpentata (Herrich-Schäffer, 1869)
 T. s. lavara (Couchman, 1954)
 Samphire blue, Theclinesthes sulpitius (Miskin, 1890)
 genus: Sahulana
 Glistening line-blue, Sahulana scintillata (T. P. Lucas, 1889)
 genus: Neolucia (heath-blues)
 Fringed heath-blue, Neolucia agricola (Westwood, 1851)
 N. a. agricola (Westwood, 1851)
 N. a. insulana (Waterhouse & Lyell, 1914)
 N. a. occidens (Waterhouse & Lyell, 1914)
 Montane heath-blue, Neolucia hobartensis (Miskin, 1890)
 N. h. hobartensis (Miskin, 1890)
 N. h. monticola (Waterhouse & Lyell, 1914)
 Dull heath-blue, Neolucia mathewi (Miskin, 1890)
 genus: Jamides (ceruleans)
 White-banded cerulean, Jamides aleuas (C. & R. Felder, 1865)
 J. a. coelestis (Miskin, 1891)
 Shining cerulean, Jamides amarauge (Druce, 1891)
 *King cerulean, Jamides bochus (Stoll, 1782) [*native to Christmas Island]
 *Papuan cerulean, Jamides nemophila (Butler, 1876) [*native to Darnley Island]
 Pale cerulean, Jamides cyta (Boisduval, 1832)
 J. c. claudia (Waterhouse & Lyell, 1914)
 Purple cerulean, Jamides phaseli (Mathew, 1889)
 genus: Catochrysops (pea-blues)
 Cobalt pea-blue, Catochrysops amasea (Waterhouse & Lyell, 1914)
 C. a. amasea (Waterhouse & Lyell, 1914)
 Pale pea-blue, Catochrysops panormus (C. Felder, 1860)
 C. p. platissa (Herrich-Schäffer, 1869)
 C. p. papuana (Tite, 1959)
 genus: Lampides
 Long-tailed pea-blue, Lampides boeticus (Linnaeus, 1767)
 genus: Leptotes (synonyms Tarucus and Syntarucus)
 Plumbago blue, Leptotes plinius (Fabricius, 1793)
 L. p. pseudocassius (Murray, 1873)
 genus: Zizeeria
 Spotted grass-blue, Zizeeria karsandra (Moore, 1865)
 genus: Zizina
 Common grass-blue, Zizina labradus (Godart, 1824)
 Z. l. labradus (Godart, 1824)
 Z. l. labdalon (Waterhouse & Lyell, 1914)
 *Lesser grass-blue, Zizina otis (Fabricius, 1787) [*native to Christmas Island]
 genus: Famegana
 Black-spotted grass-blue, Famegana alsulus (Herrich-Schäffer, 1869)
 F. a. alsulus (Herrich-Schäffer, 1869)
 genus: Zizula
 Dainty grass-blue, Zizula hylax (Fabricius, 1775)
 Z. h. attenuata (T. P. Lucas, 1890)
 genus: Everes
 Orange-tipped pea-blue, Everes lacturnus (Godart, 1824)
 E. l. australis (Couchman, 1962)
 genus: Pithecops
 Pied blue, Pithecops dionisius (Boisduval, 1832)
 P. d. dionisius (Boisduval, 1832)
 genus: Neopithecops
 Devil's blue, Neopithecops lucifer (Röber, 1886)
 N. l. heria (Fruhstorfer, 1919)
 genus: Megisba
 Small pied blue, Megisba strongyle (C. Felder, 1860)
 M. s. nigra (Miskin, 1890)
 genus: Udara
 Delicate blue, Udara tenella (Miskin, 1891)
 genus: Euchrysops
 Spotted pea-blue, Euchrysops cnejus (Fabricius, 1798)
 E. c. cnidus (Waterhouse & Lyell, 1914)
 genus: Freyeria
 Jewelled grass-blue, Freyeria putli (Kollar, 1844)
 F. p. putli (Kollar, 1844)

Nymphalidae: brush– or four-footed
family: Nymphalidae (brush– or four-footed) — 81+6 species

Morphinae
 subfamily: Morphinae
 tribe: Amathusiini
 genus Taenaris
 Pearl owl, Taenaris artemis (Snellen van Vollenhoven, 1860)
 T. a. jamesi (Butler, 1876)
 *Silky owl, Taenaris catops (Westwood, 1851) [*native to Saibai and Darnley Islands]

Satyrinae

 subfamily: Satyrinae
 tribe: Biini
 subtribe: Melanititi
 genus: Melanitis
 Evening brown, Melanitis leda (Linnaeus, 1758) — pictured right
 M. l. bankia (Fabricius, 1775)
 *Banded evening brown, Melanitis amabilis (Boisduval, 1832) [*native to Darnley Island]
 *Papuan evening brown, Melanitis constantia (Cramer, 1777) [*native to Murray Island]
 tribe: Elymniini
 subtribe: Elymniiti
 genus: Elymnias
 Palmfly, Elymnias agondas (Boisduval, 1832)
 E. a. australiana (Fruhstorfer, 1900)
 subtribe: Mycalesiti
 Dusky bush-brown, Orsotriaena medus (Fabricius, 1775) — pictured right
 O. m. moira (Waterhouse & Lyell, 1914)
 Dingy bush-brown, Mycalesis perseus (Fabricius, 1775) — pictured right
 M. p. perseus (Fabricius, 1775)
 Cedar bush-brown, Mycalesis sirius (Fabricius, 1775)
 M. s. sirius (Fabricius, 1775)
 Orange bush-brown, Mycalesis terminus (Fabricius, 1775)
 M. t. terminus (Fabricius, 1775)
 tribe: Satyrini
 subtribe: Ypthimiti
 genus: Ypthima
 Dusky knight, Ypthima arctoa (Fabricius, 1775)
 Y. a. arctoa (Fabricius, 1775)
 subtribe: Hypocystiti
 genus: Hypocysta
 Hypocysta adiante (Hübner, 1831)
 H. a. angustata (Waterhouse & Lyell, 1914)
 Hypocysta euphemia (Westwood, 1851)
 Hypocysta irius (Fabricius, 1775)
 Hypocysta metirius (Butler, 1875)
 Hypocysta pseudirius (Butler, 1875)
 genus: Nesoxenica — endemic to Tasmania
 Tasmanian xenica, Nesoxenica leprea (Hewitson, 1864)
 N. l. leprea (Hewitson, 1864)
 N. l. elia (Waterhouse & Lyell, 1914)
 genus: Argynnina
 Argynnina cyrila (Waterhouse & Lyell, 1914)
 Argynnina hobartia (Westwood, 1851)
 genus: Oreixenica
 Oreixenica correae (Olliff, 1890)
 Oreixenica kershawi (Miskin, 1876)
 Oreixenica lathoniella (Westwood, 1851)
 Oreixenica latialis (Waterhouse & Lyell, 1914)
 Oreixenica orichora (Meyrick, 1885)
 Oreixenica ptunarra (Couchman, 1953)
 genus: Geitoneura
 Ringed xenica, Geitoneura acantha (Donovan, 1805) — pictured right
 Marbled xenica, Geitoneura klugii (Guérin-Méneville, 1830) — pictured right
 Geitoneura minyas (Waterhouse & Lyell, 1914)
 genus: Heteronympha
 Banks' brown, Heteronympha banksii (Leach, 1814) — pictured right
 Heteronympha cordace (Geyer, 1832)
 Heteronympha merope (Fabricius, 1775)
 Heteronympha mirifica (Butler, 1866)
 Heteronympha paradelpha (Lower, 1893)
 Heteronympha penelope (Waterhouse, 1937)
 Heteronympha solandri (Waterhouse, 1904)
 genus: Tisiphone
 Tisiphone abeona (Donovan, 1805)
 Tisiphone helena (Olliff, 1888)

Charaxinae: leafwings

 subfamily: Charaxinae (leafwings)
 genus: Charaxes
 Orange emperor, Charaxes latona (Butler, 1865)
 genus: Polyura
 Tailed emperor, Polyura sempronius (Fabricius, 1793) — pictured right
 Polyura pyrrhus sempronius (Fabricius, 1793)
 *Christmas emperor, Polyura andrewsi (Butler, 1900) [*native to Christmas Island]

Apaturinae
 subfamily: Apaturinae
 genus: Apaturina
 Apaturina erminea (Cramer, 1779)
 A. e. papuana (Ribbe, 1884)

Heliconiinae: longwings

 subfamily: Heliconiinae (longwings)
 tribe: Acraeini
 genus: Acraea
 Glasswing, Acraea andromacha (Fabricius, 1775)
 A. a. andromacha (Fabricius, 1775)
 tribe: Heliconiini
 genus: Cethosia
 Red lacewing, Cethosia cydippe (Linnaeus, 1758)
 C. c. chrysippe (Fabricius, 1775)
 Orange lacewing, Cethosia penthesilea (Cramer, 1777)
 C. p. paksha (Fruhstorfer, 1905)
 tribe: Vagrantini
 genus: Vindula
 Cruiser, Vindula arsinoe (Cramer, 1777) — pictured right
 V. a. ada (Butler, 1874)
 genus: Cupha
 Bordered rustic, Cupha prosope (Fabricius, 1775)
 C. p. prosope (Fabricius, 1775)
 genus: Vagrans
 Tailed rustic, Vagrans egista (Cramer, 1780)
 V. e. propinqua (Miskin, 1884)
 genus: Phalanta
 Spotted rustic, Phalanta phalantha (Drury, 1773) — pictured right
 P. p. araca (Waterhouse & Lyell, 1914)
 tribe: Argynnini
 genus: Argynnis
 Laced fritillary, Argynnis hyperbius (Linnaeus, 1763) — pictured right
 A. h. inconstans Butler, 1873

Nymphalinae

 subfamily: Nymphalinae
 genus: Doleschallia
 Leafwing, Doleschallia bisaltide (Cramer, 1777) — pictured right
 D. b. australis (C. & R. Felder, 1867)
 genus: Hypolimnas
 Blue-banded eggfly, Hypolimnas alimena (Linnaeus, 1758)
 H. a. lamina (Fruhstorfer, 1903)
 H. a. darwinensis (Waterhouse & Lyell, 1914)
 Crow eggfly, Hypolimnas anomala (Wallace, 1869)
 H. a. albula (Wallace, 1869)
 *Spotted crow eggfly, Hypolimnas antilope (Cramer, 1777) [*native to Murray and Yorke Islands]
 Varied eggfly, Hypolimnas bolina (Linnaeus, 1758)
 H. b. bolina (Linnaeus, 1758)
 H. b. nerina (Fabricius, 1775)
 Danaid eggfly, Hypolimnas misippus (Linnaeus, 1764) — pictured right
 genus: Yoma
 Yoma sabina parva (Butler, 1876)
 genus: Junonia
 Northern argus, Junonia erigone (Cramer, 1775)
 Junonia hedonia zelima (Fabricius, 1775)
 Junonia orithya albicincta (Butler, 1875)
 Junonia villida calybe (Godart, 1819)
 genus: Vanessa
 Painted lady, Vanessa cardui (Linnaeus, 1758)
 Yellow admiral, Vanessa itea (Fabricius, 1775)
 Australian painted lady, Vanessa kershawi (McCoy, 1868) — pictured right
 genus: Mynes
 Jezebel nymph, Mynes geoffroyi (Guérin-Méneville, 1830)
 M. g. guerini (Wallace, 1869)

Biblidinae

 subfamily: Biblidinae (planes)
 genus: Pantoporia
 Orange plane, Pantoporia consimilis (Boisduval, 1832)
 P. c. consimilis (Boisduval, 1832)
 Black-eyed plane, Pantoporia venilia (Linnaeus, 1758)
 P. v. moorei (W. J. Macleay, 1866)
 genus: Neptis
 Yellow-eyed plane, Neptis praslini (Boisduval, 1832)
 N. p. staudingereana (de Nicéville, 1898)
 genus: Phaedyma
 White-banded plane, Phaedyma shepherdi (Moore, 1858) — pictured right
 P. s. shepherdi (Moore, 1858)
 genus: Lexias
 Orange-banded plane, Lexias aeropa (Linnaeus, 1758)

Libytheinae

 subfamily: Libytheinae
 genus: Libythea
 Purple beak, Libythea geoffroy (Godart, 1824) — pictured right
 L. g. genia (Waterhouse, 1938)
 L. g. nicevillei (Olliff, 1891)

Danainae: milkweed butterflies

 subfamily: Danainae (milkweed butterflies)
 tribe: Danaini (tigers and crows)
 genus Tirumala
 Blue tiger, Tirumala hamata (W. S. Macleay, 1826)
 T. h. hamata (W. S. Macleay, 1826)
 genus Danaus
 Swamp tiger, Danaus affinis (Fabricius, 1775) — pictured right
 D. a. affinis (Fabricius, 1775)
 D. a. alexis (Waterhouse & Lyell, 1914)
 D. a. gelanor (Waterhouse & Lyell, 1914)
 conspecific with: D. philene (Stoll, 1782)
 Orange tiger, Danaus genutia (Cramer, 1779)
 D. g. alexis (Waterhouse & Lyell, 1914)
 Monarch or wanderer, Danaus plexippus (Linnaeus, 1758) — pictured right
 Lesser wanderer, Danaus chrysippus (Linnaeus, 1758)
 D. c. petilia (Stoll, 1790)
 D. c. cratippus (C. Felder, 1860)
 genus Euploea
 No-brand crow, Euploea alcathoe (Godart, 1819)
 E. a. eichhorni (Staudinger, 1884)
 E. a. enastri (Fenner, 1991)
 E. a. monilifera (Moore, 1883)
 Common crow, Euploea core (Cramer, 1780) — pictured right
 E. c. corinna (W. S. Macleay, 1826)
 Mournful crow, Euploea algea (Godart, 1819)
 E. a. violetta (Butler, 1876)
 Bates' crow, Euploea batesii (C. & R. Felder, 1865)
 E. b. resarta (Butler, 1876)
 Climena crow, Euploea climena (Stoll, 1782)
 E. c. macleari (Butler, 1887)
 Small brown crow, Euploea darchia (W. S. Macleay, 1826)
 E. d. darchia (W. S. Macleay, 1826)
 E. d. niveata (Butler, 1875)
 Orange-flash crow, Euploea leucostictos (Gmelin, 1790)
 Two-brand crow, Euploea sylvester (Fabricius, 1793) — pictured right
 E. s. sylvester (Fabricius, 1793)
 E. s. pelor (Doubleday, 1847)
 Purple crow, Euploea tulliolus (Fabricius, 1793) — pictured right
 E. t. tulliolus (Fabricius, 1793)
 *Wide-brand crow, Euploea netscheri (Snellen, 1889) [*native to Dauan Island]
 tribe: Tellervini
 genus Tellervo
 Hamadryad, Tellervo zoilus (Fabricius, 1775)
 Cairns hamadryad, Tellervo zoilus zoilus (Fabricius, 1775)
 Cape York hamadryad, Tellervo zoilus gelo (Waterhouse & Lyell, 1914)

Hesperiidae: skippers
family: Hesperiidae (skippers) — 121+1 species

Pyrginae: spread-winged skippers
 subfamily: Pyrginae (spread-winged skippers) (Burmeister, 1878)
 genus: dusk-flats, Chaetocneme (C. Felder, 1860)
 Ornate dusk-flat, Chaetocneme denitza (Hewitson, 1867)
 Eastern dusk-flat, Chaetocneme beata (Hewitson, 1867)
 Banded dusk-flat, Chaetocneme critomedia (Guérin-Méneville, 1831)
 C. c. sphinterifera (Fruhstorfer, 1910)
 Purple dusk-flat, Chaetocneme porphyropis (Meyrick & Lower, 1902)
 genus: Euschemon (Doubleday, 1846)

 Regent skipper, Euschemon rafflesia (W. S. Macleay, 1826) — pictured right
 E. r. rafflesia (W. S. Macleay, 1826)
 E. r. alba (Mabille, 1903)
 genus: Exometoeca
 Western flat, Exometoeca nycteris (Meyrick, 1888)
 genus: Netrocoryne
 Bronze flat, Netrocoryne repanda (C. & R. Felder, 1867)
 N. r. repanda (C. & R. Felder, 1867)
 N. r. expansa (Waterhouse, 1932)
 genus: Tagiades
 Pied flat, Tagiades japetus (Stoll, 1781)
 T. j. janetta (Butler, 1870)
 *Papuan snow flat, Tagiades nestus (C. Felder, 1860)

Coeliadinae: awls, awlets and policemen
 subfamily: Coeliadinae (awls, awlets and policemen)
 genus: Allora
 Peacock awl, Allora doleschallii (C. Felder, 1860)
 Greater peacock awl, Allora major (Rothschild, 1915)
 genus: Badamia
 Narrow-winged or brown awl, Badamia exclamationis (Fabricius, 1775)
 genus: Hasora
 Green awl, Hasora discolor (C. & R. Felder, 1859)
 H. d. mastusia (Fruhstorfer, 1911)
 Common banded awl, Hasora chromus (Cramer, 1780)
 H. c. chromus (Cramer, 1780)
 Large banded awl, Hasora khoda (Mabille, 1876)
 H. k. haslia (Swinhoe, 1899)
 Broad-banded awl, Hasora hurama (Butler, 1870)

Trapezitinae: Australian skippers
 subfamily: Trapezitinae (Australian skippers)
 Blue-flash skipper, Rachelia extrusus (C. & R. Felder, 1867)
 Two-spotted grass-skipper, Pasma tasmanicus (Miskin, 1889)
 Barred skipper, Dispar compacta (Butler, 1882)
 Herimosa albovenata (Waterhouse, 1903)
 Anisyntoides argenteoornatus (Hewitson, 1868)
 Proeidosa polysema (Lower, 1908)
 Pseudoborbo bevani (Moore, 1878)
 genus: Antipodia
 Antipodia atralba (Tepper, 1882)
 Antipodia chaostola (Meyrick, 1888)
 Antipodia dactyliota (Meyrick, 1888)
 genus: Croitana
 Croitana aestiva (Edwards, 1979)
 Croitana arenaria (Edwards, 1979)
 Croitana croites (Hewitson, 1874)
 genus: Herimosa (Atkins, 1994); previously Anisynta (Lower, 1911)
 White-veined sand-skipper, Anisynta albovenata (Waterhouse, 1940)
 Mottled grass-skipper, Anisynta cynone (Hewitson, 1874)
 A. c. cynone (Hewitson, 1874)
 A. c. gunneda (Couchman, 1954)
 Two-brand grass-skipper, Anisynta dominula (Plötz, 1884)
 Montane grass-skipper or mountain skipper, Anisynta monticolae (Olliff, 1890)
 Wedge grass-skipper, Anisynta sphenosema (Meyrick & Lower, 1902)
 Chequered grass-skipper, Anisynta tillyardi (Waterhouse & Lyell, 1912)
 genus: Hesperilla
 Hesperilla chrysotricha (Meyrick & Lower, 1902)
 Hesperilla crypsargyra (Meyrick, 1888)
 Hesperilla crypsigramma (Meyrick & Lower, 1902)
 Hesperilla donnysa (Hewitson, 1868)
 Hesperilla flavescens (Waterhouse, 1903)
 Hesperilla furva (Sands & Kerr, 1973)
 Hesperilla idothea (Miskin, 1889)
 Hesperilla malindeva (Lower, 1911)
 Hesperilla mastersi (Waterhouse, 1903)
 Hesperilla ornata (Leach, 1814)
 Hesperilla picta (Leach, 1814)
 Hesperilla sarnia (Atkins, 1978)
 Hesperilla sexguttata (Herrich-Schäffer, 1869)
 genus: Mesodina
 Mesodina aeluropis (Meyrick, 1901)
 Mesodina cyanophracta (Lower, 1911)
 Mesodina gracillima (Edwards, 1987)
 Mesodina halyzia (Hewitson, 1868)
 Mesodina hayi (Edwards & A. J. Graham, 1995)
 genus: Motasingha
 Motasingha dirphia (Hewitson, 1868)
 Motasingha trimaculata (Tepper, 1882)
 genus: Neohesperilla
 Neohesperilla croceus (Miskin, 1889)
 Neohesperilla senta (Miskin, 1891)
 Neohesperilla xanthomera (Meyrick & Lower, 1902)
 Neohesperilla xiphiphora (Lower, 1911)
 genus: Oreisplanus
 Oreisplanus munionga (Olliff, 1890)
 Oreisplanus perornata (Kirby, 1893)
 genus: Signeta
 Signeta flammeata (Butler, 1882)
 Signeta tymbophora (Meyrick & Lower, 1902)
 genus: Toxidia
 Toxidia andersoni (Kirby, 1893)
 Toxidia doubledayi (C. Felder, 1862)
 Toxidia inornatus (Butler, 1883)
 Toxidia melania (Waterhouse, 1903)
 Toxidia parvulus (Plötz, 1884)
 Toxidia peron (Latreille, 1809)
 Toxidia rietmanni (Semper, 1879)
 Toxidia thyrrhus (Mabille, 1891)
 genus: Trapezites
 Silver-spotted ochre, Trapezites argenteoornatus (Hewitson, 1868)
 Speckled ochre, Trapezites atkinsi (A. A. E. Williams, M. R. Williams & R. W. Hay, 1998)
 Orange ochre, Trapezites eliena (Hewitson, 1868)
 Ornate ochre, Trapezites genevieveae (Atkins, 1997)
 Small orange ochre, Trapezites heteromacula (Meyrick & Lower, 1902)
 Silver-studded ochre, Trapezites iacchoides (Waterhouse, 1903)
 Brown ochre, Trapezites iacchus (Fabricius, 1775)
 Yellow ochre, Trapezites lutea (Tepper, 1882)
 Bronze ochre, Trapezites macqueeni (Kerr & Sands, 1970)
 Northern silver ochre, Trapezites maheta (Hewitson, 1877)
 Black-ringed ochre, Trapezites petalia (Hewitson, 1868)
 Heath ochre, Trapezites phigalia (Hewitson, 1868)
 Montane ochre, Trapezites phigalioides (Waterhouse, 1903)
 Southern silver ochre, Trapezites praxedus (Plötz, 1884)
 Sciron ochre, Trapezites sciron (Waterhouse & Lyell, 1914)
 Splendid ochre, Trapezites symmomus (Hübner, 1823)
 Sandstone ochre, Trapezites taori (Atkins, 1997)
 Laterite ochre, Trapezites waterhouse (Mayo & Atkins, 1992)

Hesperinae: grass skippers
 subfamily: Hesperinae (grass skippers)
 Mimene atropatene (Fruhstorfer, 1911)
 genus: Notocrypta
 Notocrypta waigensis (Plötz, 1882)
 N. w. proserpina (Butler, 1883)
 genus: Taractrocera
 Taractrocera anisomorpha (Lower, 1911)
 Taractrocera dolon (Plötz, 1884)
 Taractrocera ilia (Waterhouse, 1903)
 T. i. ilia (Waterhouse, 1903)
 Taractrocera ina (Waterhouse, 1903)
 Taractrocera papyria (Boisduval, 1832)
 genus: Ocybadistes
 Ocybadistes ardea (Bethune-Baker, 1906)
 O. a. ardea (Bethune-Baker, 1906)
 O. a. heterobathra (Lower, 1908)
 Ocybadistes flavovittata (Latreille, 1824)
 Ocybadistes hypomeloma (Lower, 1911)
 Ocybadistes knightorum (Lambkin & Donaldson, 1994)
 Ocybadistes walkeri (Heron, 1894)
 genus: Suniana
 Suniana lascivia (Rosenstock, 1885)
 Suniana sunias (C. Felder, 1860)
 genus: Arrhenes
 Arrhenes dschilus (Plötz, 1885)
 A. d. iris (Waterhouse, 1903)
 Arrhenes marnas (C. Felder, 1860)
 A. m. affinis (Waterhouse & Lyell, 1912)
 genus: Telicota
 Telicota ancilla (Herrich-Schäffer, 1869)
 Telicota anisodesma (Lower, 1911)
 Telicota augias (Linnaeus, 1763)
 T. a. krefftii (W. J. Macleay, 1866)
 Telicota brachydesma (Lower, 1908)
 Telicota colon (Fabricius, 1775)
 T. c. argeus (Plötz, 1883)
 Telicota eurotas (C. Felder, 1860)
 Telicota eurychlora (Lower, 1908)
 Telicota mesoptis (Lower, 1911)
 T. m. mesoptis (Lower, 1911)
 Telicota ohara (Plötz, 1883)
 genus: Cephrenes
 Cephrenes augiades (C. Felder, 1860)
 C. a. sperthias (C. Felder, 1862)
 Cephrenes trichopepla (Lower, 1908)
 genus: Sabera
 Sabera caesina (Hewitson, 1886)
 Sabera dobboe (Plötz, 1883)
 Sabera fuliginosa (Miskin, 1889)
 genus: Pelopidas
 Pelopidas agna (Evans, 1866)
 Pelopidas lyelli (Rothschild, 1915)
 genus: Parnara
 Parnara amalia (Semper, 1879)
 Parnara bada (Waterhouse, 1903)
 genus: Borbo
 Rice swift, Borbo cinnara (Wallace, 1866)
 Borbo impar (Mabille, 1883)
 B. i. lavinia (Waterhouse, 1932)
 B. i. tetragaphus (Mabille, 1891)

Remote islands species

Australia has 8,222 islands within her maritime borders. This is small in comparison with her northern neighbour Indonesia, with about 18,300 islands (high geological activity is constantly adding and removing Indonesian islands). The British Isles include more than 6,000 islands over a much smaller area. The Greek islands include about as many islands depending on the minimum size to take into account, but in an even smaller area.

Christmas Island (105°E)
 Christmas swallowtail, Papilio memnon (Linnaeus, 1758)
 Striped albatross, Appias olferna (Swinhoe, 1890)
 Christmas emperor, Polyura andrewsi (Butler, 1900)
 King cerulean, Jamides bochus (Stoll, 1782)
 Lesser grass-blue, Zizina otis (Fabricius, 1787)
 Papuan grass-yellow, Eurema blanda (Boisduval, 1836) (also on Darnley Island)
Eurema alitha (C. & R. Felder, 1832)
Euploea climena macleari (Butler, 1887)
Badamia exclamationis (Fabricius, 1775)
Borbo cinnara (Wallace, 1866)
Catochrysops panormus exiguus
Catopsilia pomona (Fabricius, 1775)
Junonia villida
Hasora chromus (Cramer, 1780)
Hypolimnas anomala (Wallace, 1869)
Hypolimnas bolina nerina (Fabricius, 1775)
Hypolimnas misippus
Lampides boeticus (Linnaeus, 1767)
Nacaduba kurava (Moore, 1858)

Torres Strait islands (142–144°E)

 Dauan Island (Dauan, 142.5°E)
 Violet line-blue, Nacaduba calauria (C. Felder, 1860) (also on Murray Island)
 White-brand crow, Euploea netscheri (Snellen, 1889)
 Gracile line-blue, Prosotas gracilis (Röber, 1886)
 Saibai Island (Saibai, 142.7°E)
 Silky owl, Taenaris catops (Westwood, 1851) — (also on Darnley Island)
 Yorke Island (Masig, 143.4°E)
 Spotted crow eggfly, Hypolimnas antilope (Cramer, 1777) (also on Murray Island)
 Darnley Island (Erub, 143.7°E)
 Papuan grass-yellow, Eurema blanda (Boisduval, 1836) (also on Christmas Island)
 Papuan snow flat, Tagiades nestus (C. Felder, 1860)
 Banded evening brown, Melanitis amabilis (Boisduval, 1832)
 Papuan cerulean, Jamides nemophila (Butler, 1876)
 Bold line-blue, Nacaduba pactolus (C. Felder, 1860) (also on Murray Island)
 Silky owl, Taenaris catops (Westwood, 1851) (also on Saibai Island)
 Murray Island (Mer, 144.0°E)
 Papuan evening brown, Melanitis constantia (Cramer, 1777)
 Dark green-banded blue, Nothodanis schaeffera (Eschscholtz, 1821)
 Violet line-blue, Nacaduba calauria (C. Felder, 1860) (also on Dauan Island)
 Spotted crow eggfly, Hypolimnas antilope (Cramer, 1777) (also on Yorke Island)

Norfolk Island (168°E)
 Norfolk swallowtail, Papilio amynthor (Boisduval, 1859)

Glossary

 aestivation — summer dormancy
 anal vein — sixth wing vein, parallel to dorsum
 androconia —
 apical area —
 apical claw —
 apical spurs —
 apiculus —
 bifid — two-pronged
 discal cell —
 imago — adult insect; fully grown, sexually mature

Major collections

Museums outside of Australia with significant Australian butterfly collections
 UK British Museum: 25,000 Australian butterflies; includes specimens collected by Joseph Banks, Walter Rothschild and Cajetan and Rudolf Felder.
 UK Hope Entomology Collections, Oxford University Museum of Natural History: 1,600 Australian butterflies.
 RF Muséum National d'Histoire Naturelle, Paris: 10,000 Australian butterflies; includes specimens collected by Hans Fruhstorfer.
 BRD :de:Staatliches Museum für Naturkunde Karlsruhe: 5,000–10,000 Australian butterflies.
 USA Jean Louis Rodolphe Agassiz Museum of Comparative Zoology, Harvard University: substantial Australian butterfly holdings, though numbers have not been estimated; includes specimens collected by RG Wind and Harry Kendon Clench.

See also
 collections
 Australian Butterfly Sanctuary, Kuranda [live specimens]
 Macleay Museum, University of Sydney [dead specimens]

 butterfly lists
 List of butterflies of Great Britain
 List of butterflies of India
 List of butterflies of North America
 List of butterflies of Tasmania
List of butterflies of Victoria

 Australian animal lists
 List of moths of Australia
 List of common spider species of Australia

Notes and references

Bibliography
 Braby, Michael F. Butterflies of Australia: their identification, biology and distribution. 2 volumes. Melbourne: CSIRO Publishing, 2000.
 [Reviewed in Australian Journal of Entomology 40 (2001): 202–204.]
 Braby, Michael F. The Complete Guide to Butterflies of Australia. Corrected edition. Collingwood, Victoria: CSIRO Publishing, 2005.
 Common, Ian FB and Doug F Waterhouse. Butterflies of Australia. 2nd edition. Sydney: Angus & Robertson, 1981.
 Edwards, ED, A. Wells, WWK Houston, J Newland and L Regan. Lepidoptera: Hesperioidea, Papilionoidea. Zoological Catalogue of Australia 31.6. CSIRO Publishing, 2001.
 Kitching, Roger L. (ed.). Biology of Australian Butterflies. Monographs on Australian Lepidoptera 6. CSIRO Publishing, 1997.

Taxonomic authorities
 Doubleday, Edward, John Obadiah Westwood and William Chapman Hewitson. The Genera of Diurnal Lepidoptera: Comprising Their Generic Characters, A Notice of Their Habits and Transformations, and A Catalogue of the Species of Each Genus. London: Longman, Brown, Green, and Longmans, 1846–52.
 Felder, Cajetan Freiherr von. 1860.
 Felder, Cajetan Freiherr von and Rudolf Felder. "Reise der Österreichischen Fregatte Novara in den Jahren 1857, 1858, 1859". Zoologischer Thiel 2 (1867): xx–xx. Illustrations by :sk:Alois Friedrich Rogenhofer are here  at Wikicommons
 Fruhstorfer, Hans. "Die Indo-Australischen Tagfalter". [Family Erycinidae]. Pages 767–798 in Adalbert Seitz (ed.), Die Gross-Schmetterlinge der Erde: eine systematische Bearbeitung der bis jetzt bekannten Gross-Schmetterlinge. Volume 9. Stuttgart: Alfred Kernen, 1914. 
 Guérin-Méneville, Félix Édouard. 1831.
 Hewitson, William Chapman. Illustrations of New Species of Exotic Butterflies: Selected chiefly from the collections of W. Wilson Saunders and William C. Hewitson. 5 volumes. London: John Van Voorst, 1851, 1862–1871, 1878.
 Hewitson, William Chapman. Illustrations of diurnal Lepidoptera. Part I. Lycænidae. London: John Van Voorst, 1867. [First published 1863, reprinted with additions until 1878.]
 Latreille, Pierre André. 1809.
 Linnaeus, Carl. Systema Naturae. 10th edition. 1758. Page 458ff.
 Macleay, William John.
 Macleay, William Sharp. "Annulosa, catalogue of insects, collected by Captain King, RN". Appendix B, pp. 438–469 in Phillip Parker King. Narrative of a Survey of the Intertropical and Western Coasts of Australia. London: John Murray, 1826.
 Miskin, William Henry
 Meyrick, Edward. 1888.
 Meyrick, Edward and OB Lower. "Revision of the Australian Hesperiadae". Transactions and Proceedings and Report of the Royal Society of South Australia 35 (1902): 112–172. ISSN 1324-177X (1877–1958)
 Olliff, Arthur Sidney.
 Tindale, Norman Barnett. "A new butterfly of the genus Papilio from Arnhem Land". Records of the South Australian Museum 3 (1927): 103–134. ISSN 0376-2750
 Tindale, Norman Barnett. "A new butterfly of the Ogyris." South Australian Naturalist (1952). ISSN 0038-2965
 Tindale, Norman Barnett. "New Rhopalocera and a list of species from the Grampian Mountains, Western Victoria." Records of the South Australian Museum (1953).
 Waterhouse, Gustavus Athol. What Butterfly is That? A Guide to the Butterflies of Australia. 8 volumes. Sydney: Angus and Robertson, 1932. [Reviewed in Nature (1933).]
 Westwood, John Obadiah.

External links

Sri Lanka Wild Life Information Database
 GART / GloBIS — :de:Globales Artregister Tagfalter (GART) / Global Butterfly Information System (GloBIS) edited by Christoph L. Häuser, Joachim Holstein, Axel Steiner
 Butterflies and Moths of the World: Generic Names and their Type-species — Natural History Museum
 Australian Insect Common Names — Commonwealth Scientific and Industrial Research Organisation (CSIRO, Australia)
 Ditrysia — Tree of Life Web Project
 AustralianButterflies.com — official website of the Australian Butterfly Sanctuary, Kuranda
 The Transactions of the Entomological Society of New South Wales. Volumes 1–2 (1863–73).
 Passos, Cyril F dos. "The dates and authorships of some names proposed by Cramer and Stoll in De Uitlandsche Kapellen voorkomende in de drie waereld-deelen Asia, Africa en America, and by Stoll alone in Aanhangsel van het werk, De Uitlandsche Kapellen, ..., door den Heere Pieter Cramer [1775]–1791", The Lepidopterists' News (1958): 195–198. ISSN 0457-5628

 01
Butterflies
Australia
Australia
Australia